August "Gus" Bogina, Jr. (born September 13, 1927) is an American former politician who served in the Kansas State Senate and Kansas House of Representatives as a Republican.

Life and career
Bogina was born in Girard, Kansas and graduated from Kansas State University with a degree in engineering; he worked as a consulting engineer during his career. In 1974, Bogina was elected to the Kansas House of Representatives. He was re-elected twice, in 1976 and 1978, before successfully running for the Kansas Senate in 1980.

Bogina was re-elected to the Senate in 1984, 1988 and 1992. He served as chairman of the Ways and Means Committee from 1985 to 1995, when he left the Senate.

Personal life
Bogina married Velma Rank in 1949; the couple had four children before later divorcing. In 1988, he remarried to Nancy Kaul, whom he met while she worked as an executive assistant to several state Senators. Nancy died in 2017.

References

1927 births
Living people
Republican Party Kansas state senators
Republican Party members of the Kansas House of Representatives
People from Shawnee, Kansas
People from Lenexa, Kansas
Kansas State University alumni
Engineers from Kansas
20th-century American engineers
20th-century American politicians